Cayetano Ré Ramírez (7 February 1938 – 26 November 2013) was a Paraguayan professional football player and manager.

Career
Ré began his career in Asunción, playing for Cerro Porteño before signing for Spanish side Elche CF in 1959. After three seasons with Elche, Ré was signed by FC Barcelona where he spent the best years of his career, especially in the 1964–1965 season in which he scored 26 goals and won the Pichichi Trophy (awarded to the top scorer of the league). After playing for four years in Barcelona (where he scored 90 goals in total) he moved to RCD Espanyol.

Ré also played for the Paraguay national team (25 caps), most importantly in the 1958 FIFA World Cup.

After retiring from football, Ré became a football coach. His best coaching job was leading the Paraguay national team to the knock-out stage in the 1986 FIFA World Cup.

Titles
Paraguayan League: 1954 (with Cerro Porteño)
Copa del Rey: 1962/63 (with FC Barcelona)
Inter-Cities Fairs Cup (now UEFA Cup): 1965/66 (with FC Barcelona)
Pichichi trophy: 1964/65 (with FC Barcelona)

Teams managed
CD Eldense - 
UD Almería - 
Onteniente - 
Córdoba CF - 
Elche CF - 
Club Guaraní - 
Paraguay national football team
Club Necaxa - 
Real Betis - 
Cerro Porteño - 
Deportes Temuco -

References

External links
 
 
  

1938 births
2013 deaths
Sportspeople from Asunción
Association football forwards
Paraguayan footballers
Paraguayan people of Italian descent
La Liga players
FC Barcelona players
RCD Espanyol footballers
Elche CF players
Terrassa FC footballers
Cerro Porteño players
Paraguay international footballers
1958 FIFA World Cup players
1986 FIFA World Cup managers
Paraguayan expatriate footballers
Expatriate footballers in Spain
Paraguayan expatriate sportspeople in Chile
Paraguayan expatriate sportspeople in Spain
Paraguayan expatriate sportspeople in Mexico
Paraguayan football managers
Paraguay national football team managers
CD Eldense managers
Real Betis managers
Córdoba CF managers
Cerro Porteño managers
Club Guaraní managers
Elche CF managers
Club Necaxa managers
Expatriate football managers in Chile
Expatriate football managers in Mexico
Expatriate football managers in Spain
Pichichi Trophy winners